Mahabal Mishra (born 31 July 1953) was a Member of Parliament of India from West Delhi. Before getting elected to Parliament, he was MLA from Dwarka Assembly constituency in New Delhi. He started his political career as a Delhi councilor from Municipal Corporation of Delhi, representing Dabri ward in 1997. In the 1998 Delhi assembly elections, he was elected MLA from Nasirpur assembly constituency. He was re-elected and held his seat in 2003 and 2008 assembly elections also.

References

Living people
Indian National Congress politicians
India MPs 2009–2014
1953 births
Lok Sabha members from Delhi
People from West Delhi district
Delhi MLAs 1998–2003
Delhi MLAs 2003–2008
Delhi MLAs 2008–2013